Pierre Marie Arthur Morelet (26 August 1809 – 9 October 1892) was a French naturalist, born in Lays, Doubs. He was a member of the Commission to Algeria, primarily as a natural artist, drawing any natural findings. He collected specimens in the Canary Islands, Guatemala and Mexico.

He had a particular interest in molluscs and was recognised as a leading expert in the field.

Morelet married Noémie de Folin, sister of Léopold de Folin. Morelet died of natural causes in 1892, in Dijon.

Taxa described
Morelet described various taxa, including:
 Cyclophorus horridulum (Morelet, 1882) - a species of land snail
 Crocodylus moreletii  (Morelet, 1850) - a crocodile

Taxa named in his honour
Taxa named in honour of Arthur Morelet include:
 Agalychnis moreletii (A.M.C. Duméril, 1853) – Morelet's Treefrog
 Crocodylus moreletii (A.H.A. Duméril & Bibron, 1851) – Morelet's Crocodile
 Mesaspis moreletii (Bocourt, 1871) – Morelet's alligator lizard
 Ommatoiulus moreletii (Lucas, 1860) – Portuguese millipede 
 Sporophila morelleti (Bonaparte, 1850) – Morelet's seedeater

Gastropods:
 Clavator moreleti Crosse & Fischer, 1868
 Conus moreleti Crosse, 1858
 Edentulina moreleti (Adams, 1868)
 Leidyula moreleti (Fischer, 1871)
 Letourneuxia moreleti (P. Hesse, 1884)
 Onoba moreleti Dautzenberg, 1889
 Patella moreleti Drouet, 1858

Bibliography 
 Morelet A. (1845). Description des mollusques terrestres et fluviatiles du Portugal. pp. [1–3], I–VII, 1–116, Pl. I–XIV. Paris. (Bailliere). scan
 Morelet A. (1860). Iles Açores. Notice sur l'histoire naturelle des Açores suivie d'une description des mollusques terrestres de cet archipel. scan

References

External links 
 

1809 births
1892 deaths
French zoologists
French malacologists
People from Doubs